Franz Xaver Wagner (May 1, 1939 – August 8, 2011) was a German comedian and author.

Life 
Wagner worked as a comedian and author in Germany. He wrote several books.

Works 
 Alpines Panoptikum. Rother, München 1978, .
 Alpines Alphabet. Rother, München 1980, .
 Franz Xaver Wagners Bergtagebuch. Rother, München 1985, .
 Tiefengrabers Erzählungen. wt-BuchTeam, Garching/Alz 2002, .

External links

References 

German male comedians
1939 births
2011 deaths
German male writers